Troy in the Late Bronze Age was a thriving coastal city consisting of a steep fortified citadel and a sprawling lower town below it. It had a considerable population and extensive foreign contacts, including with Mycenaean Greece. Geographic and linguistic evidence suggests that it corresponds to the city of Wilusa known from Hittite texts. Its archaeological sublayers Troy VIh and Troy VIIa are among the candidates for a potential historical setting for the myths of the Trojan War, since aspects of their architecture are consistent with the Iliad description of mythic Troy and they show potential signs of violent destruction.

Periodization 

Late Bronze Age Troy includes parts of the archaeological layers known as Troy VI and Troy VII. Troy VI was built around 1750 BC. Its final sublayer, Troy VIh, was destroyed around 1300 BC. The early sublayers of Troy VII were contemporary with the late period of Mycenaean culture and the Hittite Empire. The later layers were contemporary with the Greek Dark Ages and the Neo-Hittite states.

 Troy VI: 1750 BC – 1300 BC
 Troy VIIa: ca. 13th century BC
 Troy VIIb1: 12th century BC
 Troy VIIb2: 11th century BC
 Troy VIIb3: until c. 950 BC

Troy VI and VII were given separate labels by early excavators, but scholarly consensus holds that the first several sublayers of Troy VII were in fact continuations of the earlier city. As a result, some researchers have suggested relabeling Troy VIIa as Troy VIi and Troy VIIb1 as Troy VIj, with Troy VII beginning at the sublayer standardly known as VIIb2. Although the substance of this proposal is widely accepted, the original nomenclature is still generally used to avoid confusion.

Troy VI–VII 

Troy VI–VII was a major Late Bronze Age city consisting of a steep fortified citadel and a sprawling lower town below it. It was a thriving coastal city with a considerable population, equal in size to second-tier Hittite settlements. It had a distinct Northwest Anatolian culture and extensive foreign contacts, including with Mycenaean Greece, and its position at the mouth of the Dardanelles has been argued to have given it the function of regional capital, its status protected by treaties. Aspects of its architecture are consistent with the Iliad's description of mythic Troy, and several of its sublayers (VIh and VIIa) show potential signs of violent destruction. Thus, these sublayers are among the candidates for a potential historical setting of those myths.

Troy VI and VII were given separate labels by early excavators, but current research has shown that the first several sublayers of Troy VII were in fact continuations of the earlier city. Although some scholars have proposed revising the nomenclature to reflect this consensus, the original terms are typically used to avoid confusion.

Troy VI 

Troy VI existed from around 1750 BC to 1300 BC. Its citadel was divided into a series of rising terraces, of which only the outermost is reasonably well-preserved. On this terrace, archaeologists have found the remains of freestanding multistory houses where Trojan elites would have lived. These houses lacked ground-floor windows, and their stone exterior walls mirrored the architecture of the citadel fortifications. However, they otherwise display an eclectic mix of architectural styles, some following the classic megaron design, others even having irregular floorplans. Some of these houses show potential Aegean influence, one in particular resembling the megaron at Midea in the Argolid. Archaeologists believe there may have been a royal palace on the highest terrace, but most Bronze Age remains from the top of the hill were cleared away by classical era building projects.

The citadel was enclosed by a massive wall whose limestone base is visible to modern day visitors. The walls were built in a "sawtooth" style made up of - segments which joined at shallow angles. This characteristic is common in the walls of Mycenaean citadels, though at Troy it is also found in other buildings, suggesting that it may have been decorative. The walls also have a notable slope, similar to those at other sites including Hattusa. However, the walls differ from contemporary Aegean and Anatolian sites both in their lack of figural sculpture and in their masonry. While Troy VI's walls were made entirely of close-fitting ashlars, contemporary sites typically used ashlars around a rubble core.

Troy VI's walls were overlooked by several rectangular watchtowers, which would also have provided a clear view of Trojan plain and the sea beyond it. The citadel was accessed by five gates, which led into paved and drained cobblestone streets. Some of these gates featured enormous pillars which serve no structural purpose and have been interpreted as religious symbols. The halls were built in megaron style, resembling Mycenaean architecture.

The lower town was built to the south of the citadel, covering an area of roughly 30 hectares. Remains of a dense neighborhood have been found just outside the citadel walls, and traces of Bronze Age occupation have been found further away. These include huts, stone paving, threshing floors, pithoi, and waste left behind by Bronze Age industry such as murex shells associated with the manufacture of purple dye. The extent of the lower town is evidenced by a defensive ditch cut 1-2 into the bedrock. A wall or palisade may have stood several meters behind the ditch, as in the outer defenses of other cities such as Qadesh and Carchemish. However, material evidence for such a wall is limited to postholes and cuts in the bedrock.

The lower city was only discovered in the late 1980s, earlier excavators having assumed that Troy VI occupied only the hill of Hisarlik. Its discovery led to a dramatic reassessment of Troy VI, showing that it was over 16 times larger than had been assumed, and thus a major city with a large population rather than a mere aristocratic residence. However, only 2-3% of the lower city had been excavated as of 2013, and few architectural features are likely to exist. Almost 2m of the surface has eroded, likely removing much of the evidence that hadn't already decomposed, been built over, or reused in later construction.

The material culture of Troy VI appears to belong to a distinct Northwest Anatolian cultural group, with influences from the Aegean and the Balkans. The primary local pottery styles were wheel-made Tan Ware and Anatolian Gray Ware. Both styles were offshoots of an earlier Middle Helladic tradition related to Minyan Ware. The earliest gray ware at Troy was made in Aegean shapes, though by 1700 BC it had been replaced by Anatolian shapes. Foreign pottery found at the site includes Minoan, Mycenaean, Cypriot, and Levantine items. Local potters also made their own imitations of foreign styles, including Gray Ware and Tan Ware pots made in Mycenaean-style shapes, particularly after 1500 BC. Although the city appears to have been within the Hittite sphere of influence, no Hittite artifacts have been found in Troy VI. Also notably absent are sculptures and wall paintings, otherwise common features of Bronze Age cities. Troy VI is also notable for its architectural innovations as well as its cultural developments, which included the first evidence of horses at the site. 

The language spoken in Troy VI is unknown. One candidate is Luwian, an Anatolian language believed to have been spoken in the general area. Potential evidence comes from a biconvex seal inscribed with the name of a person using Anatolian hierglyphs often used to write Luwian. However, available evidence is not sufficient to establish that Luwian was actually spoken by the city's population, and a number of alternatives, such as Greek and Lemnian-Etruscan, have been proposed. Hittite documents found at Hattusa suggest that literacy existed at Troy and that the city may have had a written archive. The Alaksandu Treaty required King Alaksandu to read its text publicly three times a year, while the Milawata letter mentions that the deposed King Walmu was still in possession of wooden investiture tablets. The archive would likely have been housed in the citadel's innermost precinct, whose remains were pushed over the northern side of the hill during 3rd century construction. Despite attempts to sift through the rubble, no documents have been found.

Troy VI was destroyed around 1300 BC, corresponding with the sublayer known as Troy VIh. Damage in the Troy VIh layer includes extensive collapsed masonry and subsidence in the southeast of the citadel, indicative of an earthquake. Alternative hypotheses include an internal uprising as well as a foreign attack, though the city was not burned and no victims were found in the debris.

Troy VIIa 

Troy VIIa was the final layer of the Late Bronze Age city. It was built soon after the destruction of Troy VI, seemingly by its previous inhabitants. The builders reused many of the earlier city's surviving structures, notably its citadel wall, which they renovated with additional stone towers and mudbrick breastworks. Numerous small houses were added inside the citadel, filling in formerly open areas. New houses were also built in the lower city, whose area appears to have been greater in Troy VIIa than in Troy VI. In many of these houses, archaeologists found enormous storage jars called pithoi buried in the ground. Troy VIIa seems to have been built by survivors of Troy VI's destruction, as evidenced by continuity in material culture. However, the character of the city appears to have changed, the citadel growing crowded and foreign imports declining.

The city was destroyed around 1180 BC, roughly contemporary with the Late Bronze Age collapse but subsequent to the destruction of the Mycenaean palaces. The destruction layer shows evidence of enemy attack, including scorch marks.

Troy VIIb 

After the destruction of Troy VIIa around 1180 BC, the city was rebuilt as Troy VIIb. Older structures were again reused, including Troy VI's citadel walls. Its first phase, Troy VIIb1, appears to be largely a continuation of Troy VIIa. Residents continued using wheel-made Grey Ware pottery alongside a new handmade style sometimes known as "barbarian ware". Imported Mycenaean-style pottery attests to some continuing foreign trade. However, the city's population appears to have dropped, and rebuilding seems to be confined to the citadel.

One of the most striking finds from Troy VIIb1 is a hieroglyphic Luwian seal giving the names of a woman and a man who worked as a scribe. The seal is important since it is the only example of preclassical writing found at the site, and provides potential evidence that Troy VIIb1 had a Luwian-speaking population. However, the find is puzzling since palace bureaucracies had largely disappeared by this era. Proposed explanations include the possibility that it belonged to an itinerant freelance scribe and alternatively that it dates from an earlier era than its find context would suggest.

Troy VIIb2 is marked by dramatic cultural changes including walls made of upright stones and a handmade knobbed pottery style known as Buckelkeramik. These practices, which existed alongside older local traditions, have been argued to reflect immigrant populations arriving from southwest Europe. These newcomers may have shared an origin with the Phrygians who initiated similar cultural shifts at sites such as Gordion. This layer was destroyed around 1050 BC after an apparent earthquake.

Troy VIIb3 dates from the Protogeometric era. No new builds were constructed, so its existence is known primarily from artifacts found in the West Sanctuary and terraces on south side of mound. These areas were excavated in the 1990s, surprising the archaeologists who had assumed that the site was abandoned until the Archaic Era. Locally made neck-handled amphoras shows that Troy still had a pottery industry, possibly associated with a wine or oil industry. The style of these pots shows stylistic similarities to other North Aegean sites, suggesting cultural contact. (Because other artifacts do not show these links, archaeologists believe that Greek settlement of Troy did not begin until later.) Both the Troy VI walls and the Troy VIIa Terrace House were reused for worship and communal feasting, as evidenced by animal bones, pottery assemblages, and traces of burned incense. Strikingly, the Terrace House was not renovated when it was adopted as a cult center and thus must have been used in a ruined state, potentially suggesting that the occupants of Troy VIIb3 were deliberately re-engaging with their past.

Troy VIIb was destroyed by fire around 950 BC. However, some houses in the citadel were left intact and the site continued to be occupied, if only sparsely.

See also 

 Ahhiyawa
 Alaksandu
 Historicity of the Iliad
 Luwians
 Mycenaean Greece
 Wilusa

References 

14th-century BC establishments
Populated places established in the 2nd millennium BC
Populated places disestablished in the 10th century BC
1822 archaeological discoveries
Troy
Greek Dark Ages
Bronze Age sites in Asia